Petre Nuțu (born 22 September 1943) is a Romanian former footballer who played as a midfielder.

Honours
Dinamo Pitești
Cupa României runner-up: 1964–65
Dinamo București
Divizia A: 1970–71
Cupa României runner-up: 1970–71
Sportul Studențesc București
Divizia B: 1971–72

References

External links
Petre Nuțu at Labtof.ro

1943 births
Living people
Romanian footballers
Association football midfielders
Liga I players
Liga II players
Victoria București players
FC Argeș Pitești players
FC Dinamo București players
FC Sportul Studențesc București players
Footballers from Bucharest